KOQL (106.1 FM, "Q 106.1") is a Top 40-formatted station owned by Cumulus Media. The station broadcasts from Columbia, Missouri, with an ERP of 69,000 kW. The station serves the Mid-Missouri area. Its transmitter is located about 20 miles west of Jefferson City.

The station uses the slogan "All the hits." The station airs the syndicated The Kidd Kraddick Morning Show and mostly out-of-town DJs. Only the afternoon shift is broadcast locally.

Station history
with an adult album alternative format. In 1997, the station traded formats with 102.3 FM and became KOQL "Cool 106" with an oldies format. By 2000, the station had shifted to a jamming oldies format. In September 2001, they flipped to CHR as "Q 106.1."? On March 21, 2003, from 8:10 a.m. to 8:15 a.m., former morning show hosts Cosmo & JC aired a prank phone call between the radio station and Life Crisis Services, a gambling addiction hotline. The FCC complaint stated that the radio station personality pretended to have a legitimate gambling problem. Once the representative from Life Crisis realized it was a prank phone call, she hung up.

The station did not inform the hotline the call was for broadcast, which is a violation of Federal Communications Commission (FCC) law Section 73.1206. On April 4, 2003, Mid-Missouri Broadcasting made an official on-air apology to Life Crisis and provided a link on its website for its services, but even so, on November 23, 2004, the FCC fined Mid-Missouri Broadcasting $4,000.

Mid-Missouri Broadcasting later sold the station along with others to Cumulus Media.

References

External links
Q 106.1 - Official website

OQL
Contemporary hit radio stations in the United States
Radio stations established in 1993
1993 establishments in Missouri
Cumulus Media radio stations